Thank You is the sixth and final extended play by South Korean girl group Brave Girls. It was released by Brave Entertainment on March 14, 2022, and contains five tracks, including the lead single of the same name.

Background and release
On March 1, 2022, Brave Entertainment announced Brave Girls would be making their comeback on March 14. Two days later, it was announced that Brave Girls would be releasing their sixth extended play titled Thank You. The promotional schedule was also released in the same announcement. On March 4, the track listing was released with "Thank You" announced as the lead single. Five days later, the highlight medley teaser video was released. The music video teaser for "Thank You" was released on March 10 and 11.

Composition
The lead single "Thank You" was described as a retro dance pop and disco funk song that "contains exciting rhythm and addictive melodies." The second track "You and I" was described as a house-based dance pop song. The third track "Love Is Gone" was described as a song with lyrics that "stimulate listeners' emotions." The fourth track "Can I Love You" was described as a song with "retro synth and a groovy rhythm." The last track is a remix version of the lead single that "is more trendy by harmonizing acappella and classical sounds together."

Promotion
On March 12, 2022, Brave Entertainment announced that the extended play's showcase event, originally scheduled for March 14, was postponed after Minyoung, Yujeong, and Eunji were diagnosed with COVID-19, the event was held on March 23 where the group introduce the extended play.

Track listing

Charts

Weekly charts

Monthly charts

Release history

References

2022 EPs
Brave Girls albums
Korean-language EPs
Brave Entertainment albums